Calliotropis annonaformis is a species of sea snail, a marine gastropod mollusk in the family Eucyclidae.

Description

Distribution
This marine species occurs off Taiwan.

References

External links

annonaformis
Gastropods described in 2001